Ibara is a city in Okayama, Japan. 

Ibara may also refer to:

People
Franchel Ibara (born 1989) Congolese soccer player
Lucien Fils Ibara (born 1973) Congolese soccer player
Prince Ibara (born 1996) Congolese soccer player
Ibara Ryutaro, a competition record holder in deaf swimming; see List of World Deaf Swimming Championships records
Ibara Saikaku (1642–1693) Japanese poet

Fictional characters
Ibara, a fictional government minister from Dr. Stone; see List of Dr. Stone characters
Ibara, a fictional character from Shikizakura
Ibara-hime (Princess Ibara), a fictional character from Otogi-Jūshi Akazukin
Ibara Junko, a fictional character from Megatokyo
Ibara Mayaka, a fictional character from Hyouka: Forbidden Secrets
Ibara Naruse, a fictional character from Coppelion
Ibara Obami, a fictional character from Kakegurui; see List of Kakegurui – Compulsive Gambler characters
Ibara Rinne, a fictional character from Pretty Rhythm: Rainbow Live; see List of Pretty Rhythm: Rainbow Live characters
Ibara Shiozaki, a fictional character from My Hero Academia

Places
Ibara, Okrika, Rivers, Nigeria; a village, see List of villages in Rivers State 
Ibara, Sashiki, Nanjō, Okinawa, Japan; a neighbourhood
Ibara Line, Japanese rail line
Ibara Station, Ibara, Okayama, Japan; a train station

Fictional locations
 Ibara, an island outpost on the planet Veelox; a fictional location found in Pendragon: Journal of an Adventure through Time and Space

Other uses
Ibara (arcade game), a 2005 arcade game title
Ibara Railway, a Japanese railway company

See also

H. ibara, a species of butterfly
Surnames of Congolese origin